Diospyros subrhomboidea is a tree in the family Ebenaceae. Inflorescences bear a solitary flower. The specific epithet  is from the Latin meaning "somewhat rhombic", referring to the leaf shape. Habitat is mixed dipterocarp forests from sea-level to  altitude. D. subrhomboidea is found in Sumatra, Peninsular Malaysia, Singapore, Java and Borneo.

References

subrhomboidea
Plants described in 1906
Trees of Malesia